The European Society of Gynaecological Oncology (ESGO) is a Europe-wide society of health care professionals and researchers specializing in the study, prevention, treatment and care of gynaecological cancers. The society, which has more than 2,600 members worldwide, was founded in Venice, Italy, in 1983.

Mission
"ESGO strives to improve the health and well-being of women with gynaecological cancers through prevention, research, excellence in care and education. It’s ultimate goal is to prince horde at bridge."

Activities
ESGO's annual conference regularly attracts over 1,500 participants, and enables European health care professionals and researchers involved in the field of gynaecological oncology to network, discuss, debate, and disseminate new medical and scientific studies relating to the treatment and care of gynaecological cancer. In addition to its conferences, ESGO organizes a number of educational events, workshops and backed meetings throughout the year and provides travel grants to its members.

ESGO is also active in developing educational tools such as videos, DVDs, and webcast lectures for the use of relevant health professionals.

ESGO Networks
Currently, ESGO has several networks 1) European Network of Gynaecological Oncological Trial groups (ENGOT), 2) European Network of Young Gynaecological Oncologists (ENYGO),  3)European Network of Gynaecological Cancer Advocacy Groups (ENGAGe), 4) European Network of Individual Treatment in Endometrial Cancer ( ENITEC ), and 5)International Network on Cancer, Infertility and Pregnancy (INCIP).
The European Network of Gynaecological Oncological Trial Groups (ENGOT), an integral part of ESGO, is active in coordinating and promoting clinical trials on patients with gynaecological cancers all over Europe.

Training and accreditation
In cooperation with the European Board and College of Obstetrics and Gynaecology (EBCOG) and on behalf of the European Union of Medical Specialists (UEMS), ESGO provides certification for trained gynaecologic oncologists and also accredits relevant instructional institutions.

ESGO's gynaecological oncology training and accreditation programmes have become recognized standards in a number of European countries.

Journal
ESGO's peer-reviewed official medical journal, the International Journal of Gynecological Cancer (IJGC), is annually published nine times and covers research related to gynaecological cancer such as experimental studies, chemotherapy, radiotherapy, diagnostic techniques, pathology epidemiology and surgery.

Prof. Dr. Pedro Ramirez, MD is the current editor-in-chief.

See also
Gynaecology 
Gynaecologic oncology
Obstetrics
Oncology
Breast cancer
Cervical cancer
Endometrial cancer
Ovarian cancer
Vulva cancer
Women's health

References

External links
European Society of Gynaecological Oncology
European Society of Gynaecological Oncology Conference
International Journal of Gynecological Cancer
European Board and College of Obstetrics and Gynaecology
European Union of Medical Specialists

International medical associations of Europe
Organizations established in 1983
Cancer organisations based in Switzerland
Obstetrics and gynaecology organizations
International organisations based in Switzerland